Salt Point is a community in the Canadian province of Manitoba.

Demographics 

References

Designated places in Manitoba
Northern communities in Manitoba